Tom Wilber is an American journalist and public speaker who specializes in environmental issues. His 2012 book, Under the Surface: Fracking, Fortunes and the Fate of the Marcellus Shale (Cornell University Press), was selected as a finalist for the 2013 New York Public Library’s Helen Bernstein Book Award for Excellence in Journalism. He wrote for 17 years for the Gannett Company’s Central New York Newspaper Group, where he won individual or team Best of Gannett honors on four occasions, most recently in 2010 for coverage of shale gas development in New York and Pennsylvania.  He has taught newspaper journalism at Binghamton University, and holds a master's degree from the S.I. Newhouse School of Public Communications program at Syracuse University.

Books 

 Under the Surface: Fracking, Fortunes and the Fate of the Marcellus Shale, Cornell University Press, 2012.

Reviews 
 The New York Review of Books review of Under the Surface
 Associated Press review of Under the Surface
  Publishers Weekly review of Under the Surface
 Journal of Comparative Policy Analysis review of Under the Surface

Interviews and articles 
 Radio interviews on WNYC'sThe Brian Lehrer Show
 Radio interview on WSKG's Off the Page
 Radio interview on WAMC's The Round Table
 Radio interview on WCNY's Capitol Press Room
 Radio interview on Australian Broadcasting Corporation's Radio National Breakfast
 Movie review in The Huffington Post
 Featured on The New York Times' Dot Earth
 Article in Buffalo Spree
 Article in the Press & Sun Bulletin

External links 
 Lecture at Cornell University, April 4, 2013: Fracking and the Future of Global Energy: Golden Age or Dark Age?
 Tom Wilber's Shale Gas Review

References 

Year of birth missing (living people)
Living people
Place of birth missing (living people)
American male journalists
S.I. Newhouse School of Public Communications alumni